Wilczna  is a village in the administrative district of Gmina Skaryszew, within Radom County, Masovian Voivodeship, in east-central Poland.

The village has an approximate population of 140.

References

Wilczna